Incat Crowther is an Australian Company, headquartered in Belrose, a suburb of Sydney specializing in Marine engineering design. Incat Crowther has offices in Lafayette, Louisiana, United States and Romsey, UK.

The company has a diverse product portfolio of designs for monohull, catamaran and trimaran vessels with a composite, aluminium and steel construction for a range of sectors, including commercial, recreational, military and passenger.

History
The company was created from a merger of Incat Designs - Sydney and Crowther Designs in 2005.

Crowther Design founder Lock Crowther had a history in catamaran, trimaran and commercial vessel design.

Incat Designs (Sydney, formed 1988) founder Philip Hercus (1992 AGM Michell medal recipient from the Institution of Engineers, Australia) had a history in passenger vessel catamaran design.
 
In 1977), he formed a partnership, namely International Catamaran Pty Ltd designing and building catamarans in Tasmania. This combination made significant advances in fast powered catamaran technology culminating in the wave piercing catamarans.

Early in 1988, the shipyard partnership was mutually terminated and a design-only company, International Catamaran Designs Pty Ltd (Incat Designs - Sydney) was formed as part of the Hercus Marine Group.
The other partner Robert Clifford then commenced designing and building under a new company, Incat Tasmania Pty Ltd.

Philip Hercus and Robert Clifford received the Order of Australia (AO) in 1995 for service to the shipbuilding industry.

Both merging companies have had long partnerships with the following shipyards:
Gladding-Hearn Shipbuilding, Richardson Devine Marine, Nichols Bros, Gulfcraft, Cheoy Lee Shipyards, Aluminium Marine, Kvichak Marine and NQEA Australia.

Later partnerships have emerged with:
Arpoador Engenharia, Astilleros Armon, ETP Engenharia Ltda., Incat, PT Caputra Mitra Sejati Shipyard, Veecraft Marine

Over 650 vessels built to Incat Crowther designs have been delivered. These include Eleanor Roosevelt, the world's first very large catamaran Ro-Pax ferry powered by dual-fuel reciprocating engines, and New York City Ferry's 40-plus vessel fleet.

Records
A world waterskiing record of 114 Skiers by the Horsehead Water Ski Club on 28 March 2010 was set utilizing the vessel Eagle.

This record was again broken utilizing the Eagle on 27 January 2012 with 145 skiers making the nautical mile journey.

References

External links
 

Companies based in New South Wales
Shipbuilding companies of Australia
Companies established in 2003